Adenopilina adenensis is a species of monoplacophoran, a superficially limpet-like marine mollusc. It is known from only one specimen collected from a depth of 3000–4000 metres in the Alula-Fartak Trench of the Gulf of Aden, off the coast of Yemen.

References

Monoplacophora
Molluscs described in 1967